Misai Kosugi (30 December 1881 – 16 April 1964) was a Japanese painter. His work was part of the painting event in the art competition at the 1932 Summer Olympics.

References

External links
 

1881 births
1964 deaths
20th-century Japanese painters
Japanese painters
Olympic competitors in art competitions
People from Tochigi Prefecture